Bandar Awdah Al-Enezi (born 11 August 1987) is a Saudi footballer who plays for Al-Nojoom as a midfielder.
 Having played for Al Hajer from 2004 to 2008, he moved to Al-Hilal in 2008, but returned to Al Hajer in January 2011.

References

Living people
1987 births
Association football midfielders
Saudi Arabian footballers
Hajer FC players
Al Hilal SFC players
Al-Nojoom FC players
Al Omran Club players
Al-Taraf Club players
Saudi First Division League players
Saudi Professional League players
Saudi Second Division players
Saudi Fourth Division players
Saudi Third Division players